Jeremy Kenyon Lockyer Corbell (born February 3, 1977) is an American contemporary artist, documentary filmmaker, and ufologist based in Los Angeles, California. Corbell is a mixed media artist whose exhibitions combine art, fashion, and film. He is also a photographer, fashion designer, and author. He has worked with Bob Lazar and his mentor in journalism, George Knapp.

Early life
Corbell was born in Los Angeles in 1977.

After graduating from the Harvard-Westlake High School in 1995, Corbell entered the University of California, Santa Cruz, and graduated with a Bachelor of Arts degree in "Quantum Studies."

Martial arts career
Corbell is a Black Belt in Jujitsu. In 2001, his first book was published, Radiant Source - Cultivating Warrior Consciousness, about his philosophy of martial arts.

Corbell taught Jujitsu and Yoga at the University of California Santa Cruz for many years, developing his own styles of martial and healing arts, Quantum Jujitsu and Warrior Yoga. He has appeared in Black Belt Magazine, Yoga Journal, and others.

At-risk youth programs
Corbell developed a martial arts and yoga curriculum to provide training for at-risk youth. This includes a Juvenile Hall yoga program to incorporate his philosophy of meaningful living with the practical instruction of Warrior Yoga. Following discharge from Juvenile Hall, students continue instruction during and after their probation period.

Film work and demonstrations
Corbell has consulted on films such as I Am Number Four and Bunraku, and for video games such as UFC Undisputed 2010. One of his Jujitsu demonstrations has received over 5.9 million views on YouTube.

Near-fatal illness
While traveling in Nepal and India in 2004 Corbell contracted Valley fever. He made it home to be treated by doctors at UCLA. Unable to practice martial arts for over a year due to medical complications, he began creating art.

Fine art career
In 2004, Corbell began secretly harvesting local building demolitions for early-century windows and doors in the Los Angeles area. He began recycling them into art installations. Over the years Corbell has exhibited numerous bodies of work in avant-garde locations, private settings and galleries across the United States. His invitational art events have generated national interest and press.

Notable art exhibitions
Some of the exhibitions by Corbell include:

Death to Life: Corbell disassembled computers and embedded them into vintage doors and windows harvested from local Los Angeles demolitions. The pieces were distributed throughout the Los Angeles area and showed rotating imagery and sounds from his travels in Nepal and India.

Factory Girl Exhibition: In coordination with a pre-premiere of the Factory Girl (2006 film), Corbell exhibited an original body of work as part of a comparative exhibition with a series of privately owned Andy Warhol paintings.

ICON: Life Love & Style of Sharon Tate: In honor of the 40th anniversary of Sharon Tate's passing, with the blessing of the Tate family he created a 350-piece historic art exhibition celebrating Sharon Tate's style and life. The art and fashion based exhibition showcases images of her wardrobe by designers such as Christian Dior, Thea Porter, Ossie Clark and Yves Saint Laurent.

Strange Love: An artistic collaboration between Corbell and Katrina Bea held in historic downtown Los Angeles. The body of work included assemblage works, paintings, photography, film and fashion.

Bunraku Art Experience: Chateau Marmont: Held at the Chateau Marmont (Penthouse 64) in Hollywood California, Corbell hosted a one night only art installation for the cast of the Bunraku (film) by Director Guy Moshe. In lieu of a premiere, Corbell's art exhibition revealed images and art pieces of Demi Moore, Josh Hartnett, Woody Harrelson, Ron Perlman and Kevin McKidd.

Fashion design
In the Summer of 2010, Corbell launched his art-apparel line called ICON Apparel. A collaboration with Five Four Clothing's Creative Director Andres Izquieta, ICON Apparel was inspired by Corbell's mixed media art. Each piece was hand-touched and autographed by the artist. The line launched at Fred Segal in Santa Monica California and was limited edition.

Film career
Corbell has made a number of experimental and documentary films presented on Netflix & Hulu including:
Lost Vegas (short), which follows six characters in Las Vegas through the night of May 21, 2011, the supposed "night of Rapture" the "end of the world" as predicted by certain religious sects
Immaculate Deception, on the subject of the “Godfather of Conspiracy" and ex-CIA operative, John Lear (disinherited heir to the Lear Jet aviation empire)
The Anonymous Interview, highlighting an alleged ex-CIA operative who claims, through his military and intelligence career, to have been exposed to realities and technologies of an extraterrestrial nature.
Truth Embargo, in which a journalist, a historian and an activist attempt to prove that “we are not alone”.
Nano Man: Utility Fog, in which a military-funded nanophysicist claims to possess a mysterious metamaterial created by another intelligence
Patient Seventeen, about a surgeon, the late Dr. Roger Leir, who claimed to remove Alien implants, nanotechnology microchips embedded by aliens monitoring the earth.
Hunt for the Skinwalker, based on a book by George Knapp and Dr Colm Kelleher, and distributed by The Orchard, focusing on Skinwalker Ranch.
Bob Lazar: Area 51 & Flying Saucers, a feature-length documentary focused on the claims of Bob Lazar that he back-engineered alien spacecraft from another world for the United States military at a secret base called S-4 (near Area 51).

Investigative film series
In 2015, Corbell launched his investigative film series titled, "Extraordinary Beliefs presented by Jeremy Kenyon Lockyer Corbell". Corbell explores the beliefs of people deep within the aerospace, military, conspiracy, extraterrestrial, and underworld communities. Topics include advanced nanotechnology, non-lethal weaponry, off-world technologies, space travel, and extraterrestrial contact.

Release of UAP Media 
Corbell has released several Unidentified Aerial Phenomena (UAP) videos and still images, which have been verified as authentic by sources in The Pentagon and Dept. of Defense. These have included images taken by pilots using their cellphones while in cockpit, Radar data showing 14 UAPs "swarming" the USS Omaha, and video of Triangular "crafts" in the sky, filmed by US Navy personnel.

References

External links
 
 

1977 births
American contemporary artists
Artists from Los Angeles
American experimental filmmakers
Living people
University of California, Santa Cruz alumni
Film directors from Los Angeles